Brando Pacitto (born 1 March 1996 in Rome) is an Italian actor.

Career 
Pacitto started his acting career as a 4-year-old child, at the Clesis in Rome, and later entered the theatrical school by actor and playwright Thomas Otto Zinzi, with whom he still works today. In 2006 he played the role of baby Jesus in the TV series The Holy Family (La sacra famiglia), co-starring Ana Caterina Morariu (Mary) and Alessandro Gassmann (Joseph). In 2007 he starred Liberi di giocare by Francesco Miccichè, with Pierfrancesco Favino and Isabella Ferrari. He later portrayed Lorenzo in the television film Al di là del lago (2009) and in its sequel drama Al di là del lago (2010), both starring Kaspar Capparoni and Gioia Spaziani. He was in Dov'è mia figlia? (2011) by Monica Vullo, with Claudio Amendola and Serena Autieri, and in the two-episode film Walter Chiari – Fino all'ultima risata (2012) by Enzo Monteleone, with Alessio Boni and Bianca Guaccero, where he played the role of 15-year-old Simone Annichiarico. He took part in Rai 1 series Una buona stagione in 2013. Since the following year he's starring as Vale in highly rated TV drama Braccialetti rossi, also broadcast by Rai 1. In 2015 he was in Jovanotti's L'estate addosso music video and in the homonymous film by Gabriele Muccino, released in September 2016. In this year he has acted in Piuma, a film by Roan Johnson.

Pacitto is also a surfer, winning the Italian leg of the important competition Quicksilver King of the Groms in 2012.

Filmography

Awards and nominations 
 2014 – Roma Fiction Fest: Premio speciale della giuria (Special Jury Prize) to the main cast of Braccialetti rossi (Carmine Buschini, Brando Pacitto, Aurora Ruffino, Mirko Trovato, Pio Luigi Piscicelli and Lorenzo Guidi).

Note

External links 
 
  
 
 Progetto Miniera – Theatrical School by Thomas Otto Zinzi

Living people
1996 births
21st-century Italian male actors
Italian male television actors
Male actors from Rome